Kolbad-e Gharbi Rural District is a rural district (dehestan) in Kolbad District, Galugah County, Mazandaran Province, Iran. At the 2006 census, its population was 4,805, in 1,204 families. The rural district has 4 villages.

References 

Rural Districts of Mazandaran Province
Galugah County